Franklin Park, New Jersey may refer to:

 Franklin Park, New Jersey, census-designated place within Franklin Township, Somerset County
 Franklin Park, Middlesex County, New Jersey, adjacent to the first Franklin Park in North Brunswick and South Brunswick townships, Middlesex County
 Franklin Park, Trenton, New Jersey, unrelated to the first two, located in the city of Trenton, Mercer County